Operation Forty Stars, also known as Operation Forty Lights, or Chelcheraq, was a military operation conducted by the MEK and the Iraqi military at the closing stages of the Iran–Iraq War on 18 June 1988. According to the MEK, the Iraqi army did not participate in this operation. The goal was to occupy the Iranian border city of Mehran to control its oil fields, as well as Kurdish villages in the region.

In four days, the People's Mujahedin of Iran wiped out a Pasdaran division, seizing Mehran and building a bridgehead twelve miles into Iran.

Background

On 18 June 1988, Operation Forty Stars (Persian: Chehel Cheragh) was one of those battles, planned in conjunction with the Iranian opposition group the Mujahedeen-e-Khalq (MEK), which was actively collaborating with Iraq. While Iraq would support the attack with armor, artillery, air power, and chemical weapons, the bulk of the infantry operations would be carried out by the MEK forces.

The battle

According to the Center for Strategic and International Studies, on the night of Saturday 18 June, Iraq launched the operation with the help of the MEK, which had been trained and armed in Iraq. By employing nerve gas and 530 ground-attack sorties with fighter aircraft and helicopter gunships, they crushed the Iranian forces in the area around Mehran, killing or wounding 3,500 and nearly destroying a Revolutionary Guard division. Finally, The Iranian town of Mehran was captured and occupied by the combined MEK and Iraqi forces. The Iraqi and MEK forces captured several heights around the city, and took several supply dumps intact, enough to equip and supply 2 divisions. Booty included many Toyota Land Cruisers. 

According to the MEK, Iraqi soldiers did not participate in the operation. Baghdad also said it was not involved in the battle, with Time magazine reporting that "Iraq did claim that its forces had recaptured the oil-rich Majnoun islands east of the Tigris River, where Iranian defenders had been entrenched since 1984."

In June 1988, Tehran radio said Iranian forces had wounded or killed 3,000 Iraqi soldiers. According to the statement and a report by AP News agency, 8,000 Iranians were killed or wounded and more than 1,500 captured in the battle, and about 16,000 Iranians were involved. 

The Iraqi forces left the area after three days, and MEK forces remained there. Iranian defense forces killed all remained MEK forces inside Iran territory in Mersad operation. Finally, both side of war had officially accepted ceasefire on 20 July 1988.

Aftermath

According to Associated Press, the Iraqis later withdrew back across the border on the night of 21 June, leaving the MEK forces in occupation of the area. 

It was a severe defeat for the Iranian forces, who lost a large amount of intact equipment, along with many troops killed or captured. Iraq also launched a wide-scale strategic bombing campaign on Iranian population centres and economic targets, setting 10 oil installations and six crude oil production plants in Ahwaz on fire and two pumping stations at Bibi Hakimeh as well as the destruction of other facilities at Gachsaran. Moreover, the bombing campaign included strikes on power stations, natural gas plants and offshore oil facilities.

On 26 July 1988, Iranian forces launched Operation Mersad, and took back Mehran from MEK forces.

See also

People's Mujahedin of Iran
Massoud Rajavi
Operation Mersad

References

External links
THE COMBINATION OF IRAQI OFFENSIVES AND WESTERN INTERVENTION FORCE IRAN TO ACCEPT A CEASE-FIRE: SEPTEMBER 1987 TO MARCH 1989 

Conflicts involving the People's Mojahedin Organization of Iran
Forty Stars
Military operations involving chemical weapons during the Iran–Iraq War
Military operations of the Iran–Iraq War involving the Peshmerga